Mattias Andréasson (born 29 March 1981 in Västerås), Swedish singer and Swedish Idol 2007 contestant (in which he came 5th place).  As a student, he attended the Adolf Fredrik's Music School in Stockholm. He is also known as dmaSOUL. He was part of Swedish band E.M.D., which was active between 2007 and 2010.

Idol
For his first audition in Idol 2007, Mattias sang the Musiq Soulchild hit Just Friends. During the Qualifying week he sang Never Again by Justin Timberlake, and Again by Lenny Kravitz.

Mattias was voted out of Idol on 16 November 2007, finishing 5th overall.

After Idol

Andréasson's version of Elton John's "Your Song" was released as a single and reached 48th place on the Swedish Singles Chart.

In E.M.D.
During Autumn 2007, he formed Swedish trio E.M.D., with previous Idol contestants Erik Segerstedt and Danny Saucedo. Their first single, a cover of Bryan Adams, Rod Stewart and Sting's hit "All For Love", rose to 3rd place on Hitlistan on 20 December of the same year. The band broke up in late 2010.

In Melodifestivalen 2012
Mattias Andréasson took part in Melodifestivalen 2012, a preliminary round to pick the representative of Sweden in the 2012 Eurovision Song Contest in Baku, by singing the song "Förlåt mig" (meaning Forgive Me in Swedish) written by him. He sang it in the third semi-final, held on 18 February 2012 in Tegera Arena, Leksand, but he did not qualify for the final.

Discography

Studio albums
2008: A State of Mind
2009: A State of Mind (Deluxe Edition)
2009: Välkommen hem
2010: Rewind

Solo

References

External links
 Mattias Andréasson on Myspace

1981 births
Living people
People from Västerås
Idol (Swedish TV series) participants
E.M.D. members
Swedish-language singers
Melodifestivalen contestants of 2016
Melodifestivalen contestants of 2012
Melodifestivalen contestants of 2009